Inner City Bypass may refer to:

Inner City Bypass, Brisbane, road in Australia
Newcastle Inner City Bypass, road in Australia
Wellington Inner City Bypass, road in New Zealand